Meru National Park is a Kenyan national park located east of Meru,  from Nairobi. The rainfall results in tall grass and lush swamps.

The park has a wide range of wild animals including the African bush elephant, lion, African leopard, cheetah, eastern black rhinoceros, southern white rhinoceros, Grévy's zebra, hippopotamus.

Meru was one of the two areas in which conservationists George Adamson and Joy Adamson raised Elsa the Lioness made famous in the best selling book and award-winning movie Born Free. Elsa the Lioness is buried in this park and part of Joy's ashes were scattered on her gravesite.

History
Between the years 2000 and 2005, the Kenya Wildlife Service, helped by the Agence Française de Développement (AFD) and International Fund for Animal Welfare (IFAW), restored Meru National Park  from near ruin to one of the most promising tourist destinations in Eastern Africa, solving the parks poaching problem. IFAW donated $1.25 million to this major restoration project, and with this money aided in improving the basic infrastructure and provided essential equipment and vehicles for law enforcement activities.

Since 2005, the protected area is considered part of a Lion Conservation Unit.

Attractions
Aside from the scenery and wildlife, tourist attractions include the once home of George and Joy Adamson, Adamson's Falls, the burial sites of Joy Adamson and Elsa the Lioness, views of Mount Kenya, and the Tana River.

References

External links 

 Kenya Wildlife Service – Meru National Park
 Elsa Lioness Grave. FatherOfLions.org
Meru National Kenya, Safaris, Car Hire, Accommodation Lodges
Meru National Park Kenya
Complete Guide to Meru National Park

National parks of Kenya
Meru County
Tana River (Kenya)
Protected areas established in 1966
1966 establishments in Kenya
Northern Acacia-Commiphora bushlands and thickets